The Morehead State Eagles baseball team is a varsity intercollegiate athletic team of Morehead State University in Morehead, Kentucky, United States. The team is a member of the Ohio Valley Conference, which is part of the National Collegiate Athletic Association's Division I. The team plays its home games at Allen Field in Morehead, Kentucky. The Eagles are coached by Mik Aoki.

Major League Baseball
Morehead State has had 26 Major League Baseball Draft selections since the draft began in 1965.

Postseason appearances 
Morehead State has appeared in 3 NCAA tournaments:

 1983
 2015
 2018

See also
List of NCAA Division I baseball programs

References

External links